Nikon Coolpix S3100 is a compact digital camera released by Nikon in February 2011. Its image sensor is a CCD with 14 million effective pixels and has seven colors available: black, blue, pink, purple, yellow, red and silver. S3100 has a slimmer body and more scene modes than its predecessor, S3000.

Scene Modes 
The S3100 has 19 scene modes which can be accessed on the back of the camera:
 Portrait: useful for photographing faces
 Landscape:
 Sports:
 Night portrait: useful for taking portraits when the background is dark
 Party/indoor:
 Beach:
 Snow:
 sunset:
 Dusk/dawn:
 Night Landscape:
 Close-up: useful for taking detailed images
 Food:
 Macro:
 Museum:
 Fireworks show:
 Black and White Copy:
 Backlighting:
 Panorama assist:
 Pet Portrait: When a dog or cat faces the camera, the camera automatically detects the face and then release the shutter, the shutter can change to manual by disabling the pet portrait auto release feature.

See also 
 Nikon Coolpix series

References

External links 

 

Nikon Coolpix S3100-Review
 Nikon Coolpix S3100 Compact Digital Cameras Review

S3100
Cameras introduced in 2011